In Greek mythology, Hodoedocus or Hodedocus (Ancient Greek: Ὁδοίδοκος) was a son of Cynus and grandson of Opus. His father and sister, Larymna, were eponyms of the cities Kynos in Locris and Larymna in Boeotia respectively.

Hodoedocus was the father of Oileus by Agrianome, daughter of Perseon, and of Calliarus by Laonome.

Notes

References 

 Gaius Julius Hyginus, Fabulae from The Myths of Hyginus translated and edited by Mary Grant. University of Kansas Publications in Humanistic Studies. Online version at the Topos Text Project.
 Pausanias, Description of Greece with an English Translation by W.H.S. Jones, Litt.D., and H.A. Ormerod, M.A., in 4 Volumes. Cambridge, MA, Harvard University Press; London, William Heinemann Ltd. 1918. . Online version at the Perseus Digital Library
 Pausanias, Graeciae Descriptio. 3 vols. Leipzig, Teubner. 1903.  Greek text available at the Perseus Digital Library.
 Stephanus of Byzantium, Stephani Byzantii Ethnicorum quae supersunt, edited by August Meineike (1790-1870), published 1849. A few entries from this important ancient handbook of place names have been translated by Brady Kiesling. Online version at the Topos Text Project.

Locrian characters in Greek mythology